Gan of Balhae (died 818) (r. 817–818) was the ninth king of Balhae. He was the son of the sixth king, King Gang, and the younger brother of King Hui and King Jeong. He chose the era name Taesi (太始, "majestic beginning").

Family
Father: Dae Sungrin, King Gang (강왕 대숭린, 康王 大嵩璘)
Grandfather: Dae Heummu, King Mun (문왕 대흠무, 文王 大欽茂)
Older brother: Dae Wonyu, King Jeong (정왕 대원유, 定王 大元瑜)
Older brother: Dae Eonui, King Hui (희왕 대언의, 僖王 大言義)
Wife: Empress Sunmok of the Tae clan (순목황후 태씨, 順穆皇后 泰氏) – No issue.

See also
List of Korean monarchs
History of Korea

References

818 deaths
Balhae rulers
Mohe peoples
9th-century rulers in Asia
Year of birth unknown